Valley is a city in Douglas County, Nebraska, United States. The population was 1,875 at the 2010 census.

Valley is also home to the area's National Weather Service office, serving portions of eastern Nebraska and southwestern Iowa.

History
Valley was laid out as a town in 1864 when it was certain that the Union Pacific Transcontinental Railroad would be extended to that point. It was named for the Platte River valley.

Geography
Valley is located at  (41.314199, -96.348250).

Demographics

2010 census
As of the census of 2010, there were 1,875 people, 804 households, and 489 families living in the city. The racial makeup of the city was 95.3% White, 1.3% African American, 0.4% Native American, 0.5% Asian, 1.1% from other races, and 1.3% from two or more races. Hispanic or Latino of any race were 4.1% of the population.

There were 804 households, of which 29.6% had children under the age of 18 living with them, 44.3% were married couples living together, 11.2% had a female householder with no husband present, 5.3% had a male householder with no wife present, and 39.2% were non-families. 34.3% of all households were made up of individuals, and 15.8% had someone living alone who was 65 years of age or older. The average household size was 2.26 and the average family size was 2.90.

The median age in the city was 42.3 years. 23.9% of residents were under the age of 18; 7.5% were between the ages of 18 and 24; 22.2% were from 25 to 44; 28.6% were from 45 to 64; and 17.8% were 65 years of age or older. The gender makeup of the city was 47.8% male and 52.2% female.

2000 census
As of the census of 2000, there were 1,788 people, 696 households, and 455 families living in the city. The population density was 1,180.2 people per square mile (454.2/km). There were 760 housing units at an average density of 501.6 per square mile (193.1/km). The racial makeup of the city was 96.81% White, 0.56% African American, 0.50% Native American, 0.34% Asian, 0.06% Pacific Islander, 0.95% from other races, and 0.78% from two or more races. Hispanic or Latino of any race were 1.79% of the population.

There were 696 households, out of which 35.5% had children under the age of 18 living with them, 50.4% were married couples living together, 10.1% had a female householder with no husband present, and 34.6% were non-families. 30.9% of all households were made up of individuals, and 13.9% had someone living alone who was 65 years of age or older. The average household size was 2.49 and the average family size was 3.14.

In the city, the population was spread out, with 28.4% under the age of 18, 7.7% from 18 to 24, 28.4% from 25 to 44, 19.5% from 45 to 64, and 16.0% who were 65 years of age or older. The median age was 36 years. For every 100 females, there were 94.3 males. For every 100 females age 18 and over, there were 92.3 males.

As of 2000 the median income for a household in the city was $36,949, and the median income for a family was $47,596. Males had a median income of $35,847 versus $24,792 for females. The per capita income for the city was $17,508. About 7.7% of families and 11.3% of the population were below the poverty line, including 14.1% of those under age 18 and 13.2% of those age 65 or over.

Education
Valley and neighboring Waterloo operate a consolidated school system, Douglas County West Community Schools. Douglas County West (DC West) was formed in August 2005 by the merger of Waterloo Public Schools and Valley Public Schools. Douglas County West provides an extensive education from pre-school through the 12th grade. DC West Community Schools, as it is commonly called used to have two campuses in which the high school and middle school were separate. The main campus is now located at 401 S. Pine Street in Valley.

See also
First Nebraska Bank

References

External links

 
 Douglas County West Community Schools
 Historical images of Valley - Nebraska Memories

Cities in Douglas County, Nebraska
Cities in Nebraska